Cynog son of Brychan (born c. 434), better known as Saint Cynog, was an early Welsh saint and martyr. His shrine is at Merthyr Cynog in Wales and his feast day is observed on 7 or 9 October.

Cynog was reputedly a son of Brychan, a powerful Welsh prince of the British Dark Ages. Cynog's mother was reputedly Benadulved, daughter of Benadyl, a prince of Powys, whom Brychan seduced while a hostage at the court of her father.

He is said to have been murdered on the mountain called the Van (Bannau Brycheiniog). His relics are housed at Merthyr Cynog.

In 1188, Gerald of Wales wrote that there still existed a certain relic purported to be a royal torc that had once been worn by Cynog, presumably as an item of royal regalia. Gerald encountered this relic while travelling through Brycheiniog. He wrote of this relic:

The detailed description, which, though not easy to interpret, points, in the opinion of Sir T. D. Kendrick, to its probably being Welsh or Irish work of the Viking period, i.e. the 10th or the 11th century.

He is chiefly commemorated in Brycheiniog, where Defynnog, Ystradgynlais, Penderyn, Battle, Llangynog, and  Merthyr Cynog, are all named after him, the last being reputed his place of burial.

References

External links
 "St. Cynog" at Early British Kingdoms

Monarchs of Brycheiniog
Medieval Gaels
5th-century Irish monarchs
5th-century Welsh monarchs
Medieval Welsh saints
Children of Brychan
Torcs
History of Powys
5th-century Christian saints